The 1894 United States House of Representatives elections were held from June 4, 1894 to November 6, 1894, with special elections throughout the year. Elections were held to elect representatives from all 356 congressional districts across each of the 44 U.S. states at the time, as well as non-voting delegates from the inhabited U.S. territories. The winners of this election served in the 54th Congress, with seats apportioned among the states based on the 1890 United States census.

The elections comprised a significant political realignment, with a major Republican landslide that set the stage for the decisive election of 1896. The 1894 elections came in the middle of Democratic President Grover Cleveland's second term. The nation was in its deepest economic depression yet following the Panic of 1893, which pushed economic issues to the forefront. In the spring, a major coal strike damaged the economy of the Midwest and Mid-Atlantic. It was accompanied by violence; the miners lost and many joined the Populist Party. Immediately after the coal strike concluded, Eugene V. Debs led a nationwide railroad strike. It shut down the nation's transportation system west of Detroit for weeks, until President Cleveland's use of federal troops ended the strike. Debs went to prison for disobeying a court order. Illinois Governor John Peter Altgeld, a Democrat, broke bitterly with Cleveland.

The fragmented and disoriented Democratic Party was crushed everywhere outside of the South, losing more than 55% of its seats to the Republican Party. The Democrats did so poorly that even in the South, they lost seats to the Republican-Populist electoral fusion in Alabama, North Carolina, Tennessee, and Texas. The Democrats ultimately lost 127 seats in this election, with the Republicans gaining 130 seats after the resolution of several contested elections.

The Democratic Party failed to win one seat in twenty-four states and only won one seat in six states. Prominent Democrats in the house including Richard P. Bland, William McKendree Springer, and William Lyne Wilson were defeated in the election. As of 2022, the 1894 election represents the largest seat swing in a single election in the history of the House of Representatives; the only other occasion where a political party has suffered triple-digit losses was in 1932.

The main issues revolved around the severe economic depression, which the Republicans blamed on the conservative Bourbon Democrats led by Cleveland. Cleveland supporters lost heavily, weakening their hold on the party and setting the stage for an 1896 takeover by the free silver wing of the party. The Populist Party ran candidates in the South and Midwest, but generally lost ground outside of the South. The Democrats tried to raise a religious issue, claiming the GOP was in cahoots with the anti-Catholic American Protective Association; the allegations seem to have fallen flat as Catholics swung towards the GOP.

Election summaries

Special elections 

15 special elections took place in 1894 leading up to and following the general election. They are listed below in order of election date then by state and district. Republicans flipped 3 seats in the special elections in New York's 14th, Kentucky's 9th, and Maryland's 5th congressional districts.

|-
! 
| Charles T. O'Ferrall
|  | Democratic
| 1884 
|  | Incumbent resigned December 28, 1893 after being elected Governor of Virginia.New member elected January 30, 1894.Democratic hold.Winner later re-elected in November, see below.
| nowrap | 

|-
! 
| John R. Fellows
|  | Democratic
| 1890
|  | Incumbent resigned December 31, 1893 to become District Attorney of New York City.New member elected January 30, 1894.Republican gain.Winner later re-elected in November, see below.
| nowrap | 

|-
! 
| William Lilly
|  | Republican
| 1892
|  | Incumbent died December 1, 1893.New member elected February 26, 1894.Republican hold.
| nowrap | 

|-
! 
| William H. Brawley
|  | Democratic
| 1890
|  | Incumbent resigned February 12, 1894, to become judge for the United States District Court for the District of South Carolina.New member elected April 12, 1894.Democratic hold.
| nowrap | 

|-
! 
| Robert F. Brattan
|  | Democratic
| 1892
|  | Incumbent died May 10, 1894.New member elected November 6, 1894.Democratic hold.
| nowrap | 

|-
! 
| George W. Houk
|  | Democratic
| 1890
|  | Incumbent died February 9, 1894.New member elected May 21, 1894.Democratic hold.
| nowrap | 

|-
! 
| George B. Shaw
|  | Republican
| 1892
|  | Incumbent died August 27, 1894.New member elected November 6, 1894.Republican hold.
| nowrap | 

|-
! 
| William C. Oates
|  | Democratic
| 1880
|  | Incumbent resigned November 5, 1894, after being elected Governor of Alabama.New member elected November 6, 1894.Democratic hold.
| nowrap | 

|-
! 
| Thomas H. Paynter
|  | Democratic
| 1888
|  | Incumbent resigned January 5, 1895, having been elected to the Kentucky Court of Appeals.New member elected November 6, 1894, but didn't take his seat until March 4, 1895.Republican gain.
| nowrap | 

|-
! 
| Barnes Compton
|  | Democratic
| 18841890 1890
|  | Incumbent resigned May 15, 1894, to become a naval officer.New member elected November 6, 1894.Republican gain.
| nowrap | 

|-
! 
| Clifton R. Breckinridge
|  | Democratic
| 1882
|  | Incumbent resigned August 14, 1894, to become U.S. Minister to Russia.New member elected December 3, 1894.Democratic hold.
| nowrap | 

|-
! 
| Marcus C. Lisle
|  | Democratic
| 1892
|  | Incumbent died July 7, 1894.New member elected December 3, 1894.Democratic hold.
| nowrap | 

|-
! 
| Newton C. Blanchard
|  | Democratic
| 1880
|  | Incumbent resigned March 12, 1894, to become a U.S. Senator.New member elected December 3, 1894.Democratic hold.
| nowrap | 

|-
! 
| John A. Caldwell
|  | Republican
| 1888
|  | Incumbent resigned April 4, 1894, to become Mayor of Cincinnati.New member elected December 3, 1894.Republican hold.
| nowrap | 

|-
! 
| Ashbel P. Fitch
|  | Democratic
| 1886
|  | Incumbent resigned December 26, 1893, to become New York City Comptroller.New member elected December 30, 1894.Democratic hold.
| nowrap | 

|}

Early election dates

In 1894, three states, with 8 seats among them, held elections early:
 June 4 Oregon
 September 4 Vermont
 September 10 Maine

Alabama

Arkansas

California 

|-
! 
| Thomas J. Geary
|  | Democratic
| 1890
|  | Incumbent lost re-election.New member elected.Republican gain.
| nowrap | 

|-
! 
| Anthony Caminetti
|  | Democratic
| 1890
|  | Incumbent lost re-election.New member elected.Republican gain.
| nowrap | 

|-
! 
| Warren B. English
|  | Democratic
| 1892 
|  | Incumbent lost re-election.New member elected.Republican gain.
| nowrap | 

|-
! 
| James G. Maguire
|  | Democratic
| 1892
| Incumbent re-elected.
| nowrap | 

|-
! 
| Eugene F. Loud
|  | Republican
| 1890
| Incumbent re-elected.
| nowrap | 

|-
! 
| Marion Cannon
|  | Populist
| 1892
|  | Incumbent retired.New member elected.Republican gain.
| nowrap | 

|-
! 
| William W. Bowers
|  | Republican
| 1890
| Incumbent re-elected.
| nowrap | 

|}

Colorado

Connecticut

Delaware

Florida

|-
! 
| Stephen R. Mallory
|  | Democratic
| 1890
|  | Incumbent retired.New member elected.Democratic hold.
| nowrap | 

|-
! 
| Charles Merian Cooper
|  | Democratic
| 1892
| Incumbent re-elected.
| nowrap | 

|}

Georgia

Idaho 

|-
! 
| Willis Sweet
|  | Republican
| 1890
|  | Incumbent retired.New member elected.Republican hold.
| nowrap | 

|}

Illinois

Indiana

Iowa

Kansas

Kentucky

Louisiana

Maine

Maryland

Massachusetts 

|-
! 
| Ashley B. Wright
|  | Republican
| 1892
| Incumbent re-elected.
| nowrap | 

|-
! 
| Frederick H. Gillett
|  | Republican
| 1892
| Incumbent re-elected.
| nowrap | 

|-
! 
| Joseph H. Walker
|  | Republican
| 1888
| Incumbent re-elected.
| nowrap | 

|-
! 
| Lewis D. Apsley
|  | Republican
| 1892
| Incumbent re-elected.
| nowrap | 

|-
! 
| Moses T. Stevens
|  | Democratic
| 1890
|  | Incumbent retired.New member elected.Republican gain.
| nowrap | 

|-
! 
| William Cogswell
|  | Republican
| 1886
| Incumbent re-elected.
| nowrap | 

|-
! 
| William Everett
|  | Democratic
| 1893 (special)
|  | Incumbent retired.New member elected.Republican gain.
| nowrap | 

|-
! 
| Samuel W. McCall
|  | Republican
| 1892
| Incumbent re-elected.
| nowrap | 

|-
! 
| Joseph H. O'Neil
|  | Democratic
| 1888
|  |Incumbent lost renomination.New member elected.Democratic hold.
| nowrap | 

|-
! 
| Michael J. McEttrick
|  | Citizens Democratic
| 1892
|  | Incumbent lost re-election.New member electedRepublican gain.
| nowrap | 

|-
! 
| William F. Draper
|  | Republican
| 1892
| Incumbent re-elected.
| nowrap | 

|-
! 
| Elijah A. Morse
|  | Republican
| 1888
| Incumbent re-elected.
| nowrap | 

|-
! 
| Charles S. Randall
|  | Republican
| 1888
|  | Incumbent lost renomination.New member elected.Republican hold.
| nowrap | 

|}

Michigan

Minnesota

Mississippi 

|-
! 
| John M. Allen
|  | Democratic
| 1884
| Incumbent re-elected.
| nowrap | 

|-
! 
| John C. Kyle
|  | Democratic
| 1890
| Incumbent re-elected.
| nowrap | 

|-
! 
| Thomas C. Catchings
|  | Democratic
| 1884
| Incumbent re-elected.
| nowrap | 

|-
! 
| Hernando Money
|  | Democratic
| 1892
| Incumbent re-elected.
| nowrap | 

|-
! 
| John S. Williams
|  | Democratic
| 1892
| Incumbent re-elected.
| nowrap | 

|-
! 
| T. R. Stockdale
|  | Democratic
| 1886
|  | Incumbent lost renomination.New member elected.Democratic hold.
| nowrap | 

|-
! 
| Charles E. Hooker
|  | Democratic
| 1886
|  | Incumbent retired.New member elected.Democratic hold.
| nowrap | 

|}

Missouri

Montana 

|-
! 
| Charles S. Hartman
|  | Republican
| 1892
| Incumbent re-elected.
| nowrap | 

|}

Nebraska 

|-
! 
| William Jennings Bryan
|  | Democratic
| 1890
|  | Incumbent retired to run for U.S. senator.New member elected.Republican gain.
| nowrap | 

|-
! 
| David H. Mercer
|  | Republican
| 1892
| Incumbent re-elected.
| nowrap | 

|-
! 
| George de Rue Meiklejohn
|  | Republican
| 1892
| Incumbent re-elected.
| nowrap | 

|-
! 
| Eugene Jerome Hainer
|  | Republican
| 1892
| Incumbent re-elected.
| nowrap | 

|-
! 
| William A. McKeighan
|  | Populist
| 1890
|  | Incumbent lost re-election.New member elected.Republican gain.
| nowrap | 

|-
! 
| Omer Madison Kem
|  | Populist
| 1890
| Incumbent re-elected.
| nowrap | 

|}

Nevada

New Hampshire

New Jersey

New Mexico

New York

North Carolina

North Dakota 

|-
! 
| Martin N. Johnson
|  | Republican
| 1890
| Incumbent re-elected.
| nowrap | 

|}

Ohio 

|-
! 
| Bellamy Storer
|  | Republican
| 1890
|  | Incumbent retired.New member elected.Republican hold.
| nowrap | 

|-
! 
| Jacob H. Bromwell
|  | Republican
| 1894 (s)
| Incumbent re-elected.
| nowrap | 

|-
! 
| Paul J. Sorg
|  | Democratic
| 1894 (s)
| Incumbent re-elected.
| nowrap | 

|-
! 
| Fernando C. Layton
|  | Democratic
| 1892
| Incumbent re-elected.
| nowrap | 

|-
! 
| Dennis D. Donovan
|  | Democratic
| 1892
|  | Incumbent lost renomination.New member elected.Republican gain.
| nowrap | 

|-
! 
| George W. Hulick
|  | Republican
| 1892
| Incumbent re-elected.
| nowrap | 

|-
! 
| George W. Wilson
|  | Republican
| 1892
| Incumbent re-elected.
| nowrap | 

|-
! 
| Luther M. Strong
|  | Republican
| 1892
| Incumbent re-elected.
| nowrap | 

|-
! 
| Byron F. Ritchie
|  | Democratic
| 1892
|  | Incumbent lost re-election.New member elected.Republican gain.
| nowrap | 

|-
! 
| Hezekiah S. Bundy
|  | Republican
| 1893 (s)
|  | Incumbent retired.New member elected.Republican hold.
| nowrap | 

|-
! 
| Charles H. Grosvenor
|  | Republican
| 1892
| Incumbent re-elected.
| nowrap | 

|-
! 
| Joseph H. Outhwaite
|  | Democratic
| 1892
|  | Incumbent lost re-election.New member elected.Republican gain.
| nowrap | 

|-
! 
| Darius D. Hare
|  | Democratic
| 1892
|  | Incumbent retired.New member elected.Republican gain.
| nowrap | 

|-
! 
| Michael D. Harter
|  | Democratic
| 1892
|  | Incumbent retired.New member elected.Republican gain.
| nowrap | 

|-
! 
| H. Clay Van Voorhis
|  | Republican
| 1892
| Incumbent re-elected.
| nowrap | 

|-
! 
| Albert J. Pearson
|  | Democratic
| 1892
|  | Incumbent retired.New member elected.Republican gain.
| nowrap | 

|-
! 
| James A. D. Richards
|  | Democratic
| 1892
|  | Incumbent lost re-election.New member elected.Republican gain.
| nowrap | 

|-
! 
| George P. Ikirt
|  | Democratic
| 1892
|  | Incumbent retired.New member elected.Republican gain.
| nowrap | 

|-
! 
| Stephen A. Northway
|  | Republican
| 1892
| Incumbent re-elected.
| nowrap | 

|-
! 
| William J. White
|  | Republican
| 1892
|  | Incumbent retired.New member elected.Republican hold.
| nowrap | 

|-
! 
| Tom L. Johnson
|  | Democratic
| 1890
|  | Incumbent lost re-election.New member elected.Republican gain.
| nowrap | 

|}

Oregon 

|-
! 
| Binger Hermann
|  | Republican
| 1884
| Incumbent re-elected.
| nowrap | 
|-
! 
| William R. Ellis
|  | Republican
| 1892
| Incumbent re-elected.
| nowrap | 
|}

Pennsylvania

Rhode Island

South Carolina 

|-
! rowspan=2 | 
| James F. Izlar
|  | Democratic
| 1894 
|  | Incumbent retired.Democratic loss.
| rowspan=2 nowrap | 
|-
| George W. Murray
|  | Republican
| 1892
|  | Incumbent lost re-election.New member elected.Democratic gain.Murray successfully challenged Elliott's election and was awarded the seat on June 4, 1896.

|-
! 
| W. Jasper Talbert
|  | Democratic
| 1892
| Incumbent re-elected.
| nowrap | 

|-
! 
| Asbury Latimer
|  | Democratic
| 1892
| Incumbent re-elected.
| nowrap | 

|-
! 
| George W. Shell
|  | Democratic
| 1890
|  | Incumbent retired.New member elected.Democratic hold.
| nowrap | 

|-
! 
| Thomas J. Strait
|  | Democratic
| 1892
| Incumbent re-elected.
| nowrap | 

|-
! 
| John L. McLaurin
|  | Democratic
| 1892
| Incumbent re-elected.
| nowrap | 

|-
! 
| colspan=3 | None (Open seat due to redistricting)
|  | New member elected.Democratic gain.The election was voided on June 1, 1896 due to electoral fraud.
| nowrap | 

|}

South Dakota 

|-
! rowspan=2 | 
| John Pickler
|  | Republican
| 1889
| Incumbent re-elected.
| rowspan=2 nowrap | 

|-
| William V. Lucas
|  | Republican
| 1892
|  | Incumbent lost renomination.New member elected.Republican hold.

|}

Tennessee 

|-
! 
| Alfred A. Taylor
|  | Republican
| 1888
|  |Incumbent retired.New member elected.Republican hold.
| nowrap | 

|-
! 
| John C. Houk
|  | Republican
| 1891 (special)
|  |Incumbent lost re-election as an Independent Republican.New member elected.Republican hold.
| nowrap | 

|-
! 
| Henry C. Snodgrass
|  | Democratic
| 1890
|  |Incumbent lost re-election.New member elected.Republican gain.
| nowrap | 

|-
! 
| Benton McMillin
|  | Democratic
| 1878
| Incumbent re-elected.
|  nowrap | 

|-
! 
| James D. Richardson
|  | Democratic
| 1884
| Incumbent re-elected.
| nowrap | 

|-
! 
| Joseph E. Washington
|  | Democratic
| 1886
| Incumbent re-elected.
| nowrap | 

|-
! 
| Nicholas N. Cox
|  | Democratic
| 1890
| Incumbent re-elected.
| nowrap | 

|-
! 
| Benjamin A. Enloe
|  | Democratic
| 1886
|  |Incumbent lost re-election.New member elected.Republican gain.
| nowrap | 

|-
! 
| James C. McDearmon
|  | Democratic
| 1892
| Incumbent re-elected.
| nowrap | 

|-
! 
| Josiah Patterson
|  | Democratic
| 1890
| Incumbent re-elected.
| 

|}

Texas

Vermont

Virginia

Washington

West Virginia 

|-
! 
| John O. Pendleton
|  | Democratic
| 1890
|  | Incumbent lost renomination.New member elected.Republican gain.
| nowrap | 

|-
! 
| William Lyne Wilson
|  | Democratic
| 1882
|  | Incumbent retired.New member elected.Republican gain.
| nowrap | 

|-
! 
| John D. Alderson
|  | Democratic
| 1888
|  | Incumbent lost re-election.New member elected.Republican gain.
| nowrap | 

|-
! 
| James Capehart
|  | Democratic
| 1890
|  | Incumbent retired.New member elected.Republican gain.
| nowrap | 

|}

Wisconsin 

Wisconsin elected ten members of congress on Election Day, November 6, 1894.

|-
! 
| Henry Allen Cooper
|  | Republican
| 1892
| Incumbent re-elected.
| nowrap | 

|-
! 
| Charles Barwig
|  | Democratic
| 1888
|  | Incumbent lost re-election.New member elected.Republican gain.
| nowrap | 

|-
! 
| Joseph W. Babcock
|  | Republican
| 1892
| Incumbent re-elected.
| nowrap | 

|-
! 
| Peter J. Somers
|  | Democratic
| 1893
|  | Incumbent declined re-nomination.New member elected.Republican gain.
| nowrap | 

|-
! 
| George H. Brickner
|  | Democratic
| 1888
|  | Incumbent declined re-nomination.New member elected.Republican gain.
| nowrap | 

|-
! 
| Owen A. Wells
|  | Democratic
| 1892
| |  Incumbent lost re-election.New member elected.Republican gain.
| nowrap | 

|-
! 
| George B. Shaw
|  | Republican
| 1892
| |  Incumbent died August 27, 1894.New member elected.Republican hold.
| nowrap | 

|-
! 
| Lyman E. Barnes
|  | Democratic
| 1892
| |  Incumbent lost re-election.New member elected.Republican gain.
| nowrap | 

|-
! 
| Thomas Lynch
|  | Democratic
| 1890
| |  Incumbent lost re-election.New member elected.Republican gain.
| nowrap | 

|-
! 
| Nils P. Haugen
|  | Republican
| 1892
| | Incumbent declined re-nomination.New member elected.Republican hold.
| nowrap | 

|}

Wyoming 

|-
! 
| Henry A. Coffeen
|  | Democratic
| 1892
|  | Incumbent lost re-election.New member elected.Republican gain.
| nowrap | 

|}

Non-voting delegates

Oklahoma Territory 

|-
! 
| Dennis T. Flynn
|  | Republican
| 1892
| Incumbent re-elected.
| nowrap | 

|}

See also
 1894 United States elections
 1894–95 United States Senate elections
 53rd United States Congress
 54th United States Congress

Notes

References

Bibliography
 Republican Congressional Committee, Republican Campaign Text Book: 1894 (1894).
 Jensen, Richard. The Winning of the Midwest: Social and Political Conflict, 1888–1896 (1971).

External links
 Office of the Historian (Office of Art & Archives, Office of the Clerk, U.S. House of Representatives)